John Joseph O'Loughlin (10 August 1873 – 8 August 1960) was an Australian rules footballer who played for Geelong and St Kilda and an umpire in the Victorian Football League (VFL).

O'Loughlin started his career at Footscray, while they were a Victorian Football Association (VFA) club, but got his chance in the big league when he crossed to Geelong in 1898. O'Loughlin spent 1898 and 1901 at Geelong for 22 matches and 1902 at St Kilda for three matches.

When boundary umpires were introduced to the VFL in 1904, O'Loughlin was one of the first appointed. He officiated in 91 matches until 1910, including the 1909 Grand Final, and also field umpired in country Victoria.

References

External links

 

Australian rules footballers from Geelong
Geelong Football Club players
St Kilda Football Club players
Footscray Football Club (VFA) players
Australian Football League umpires
1873 births
1960 deaths